Xu Ze is a Chinese politician. He was born in October 1954, in Shantou, Guangdong, China with ancestry in Zhaoyuan, Shandong. In 1969, he joined the Communist Party of China. He graduated from Sun Yat-sen University in 1982.

He served in the People's Liberation Army in 1969, and later enrolled in Sun Yat-Sen University. After graduating in 1982, he worked in the Hong Kong and Macau Affairs Office. In July 2004, he served as deputy director of the Liaison Office of the Central People's Government in the Macao Special Administrative Region. In June 2013, he served as deputy director of the Hong Kong and Macao Affairs Office until April 2015.

In 2008, he was elected in the 11th CPPCC Standing Committee.

References 

1954 births
Living people
Sun Yat-sen University alumni
20th-century Chinese politicians
21st-century Chinese politicians
Chinese Communist Party politicians from Guangdong
Members of the Standing Committee of the 11th Chinese People's Political Consultative Conference
Politicians from Shantou